Nari Nari Naduma Murari is a 1990 Telugu-language romantic comedy film directed by A. Kodandarami Reddy. The film was produced by K. Murari under the Yuva Chitra Arts banner. It stars Nandamuri Balakrishna, Shobana, Nirosha  and music composed by K. V. Mahadevan. This is the 50th film of Nandamuri Bala Krishna and it was recorded as a Super Hit at the box office. During the pre-climax scene, Balakrishna does not appear for more than 20 minutes, which is uncommon in Telugu films.

Plot
The film begins in the village Nakkabokkalapaadu where a supercilious woman Sesharatnam prioritizes to outward beauty. She averses her henpeck husband Veerabhadraiah as he has a second spouse Nagamani. Indeed, before his marriage he loved Nagamani but by force of his mother Janakamma, he espoused Sesharatnam. Later the truth out when Sesharatnam rebukes ostracizes her mother-in-law and stays away from Veerabhadraiah. The couple has two daughters Shobha a homely & Neeraja / Neeru a naughty modern. Presently, Veerabhadraiah aspires to knit a daughter with his nephew Venkateswara Rao / Venkanna to unite the families. Anyhow, Sesharatnam inadvertently denies it. So, Veerabhadraiah gives rise to Venkanna who words his grandmother to nuptials one of his cousins and rectifies his mother-in-law. Now, Venkanna lands at their village where Sesharatnam vilifies him and challenges her to splice his daughter. 

Therefrom, he becomes operational in attempts to woo Shobha & Neeru in various squabbles and teases Sesharatnam. Parallelly, Veerabhadraiah is blackmailed by Appadu as he upholds a secret. Once, Venkanna accuses himself to protect his honor when Shobha endears him. Plus, a series of donnybrooks run between Venkanna & Neeru and she too likes him. Out of the blue, Venkanna is struck between two who proclaim that they do not reside without him. Now the story takes several twists and turns which ends hilariously. Being conscious of the ongoing, Sesharatnam rebukes and smacks her daughters when Veerabhadraiah hinders and states one of the two is not her own. Afterward, he narrates that one is the progeny of Nagamani. The two delivered at the same time, Sesharatnam gave birth to twins and lost a baby which Veerabhadraiah recouped with Nagamani's daughter. 

As of today, Sesharatnam proceeds to Janakamma and Shobha & Neeru to Nagamani to be aware of actuality. Then, Janakamma replies she also doesn't know it. Besides, Nagamani answers the woman that shared love & affection with anyone is only the true mother and asks them to retrieve. Listening to it, Sesharatnam embraces her daughters and is much obliged to Nagamani. Forthwith, the elders leave the decision to the kids who will wedlock Venkanna when the sibling asks to select his choice and he is bewildered. At last, Venkanna rushes to Lord Venkateswara where the Lord affirms that he is waiting to perceive the answer to the same question which he is unable to provide to his wives Sridevi & Bhudevi. Currently, Shobha & Neeru approaches him and he cannot respond. Finally, the movie ends on a happy note with Venkanna fusing with the two.

Cast

 Nandamuri Balakrishna as Venkateswara Rao / Venkanna
 Shobana as Shobha
 Nirosha as Neeru
 Sarada as Sesharatnam
 Kaikala Satyanarayana as Veerabhadrayya
 Allu Rama Lingaiah as Sarva Rayudu
 Tanikella Bharani as Bhairava Menon
 Babu Mohan
 Ananth
 Chitti Babu
 Chidatala Appa Rao as Swamiji
 Potti Prasad as Census Officer
 Vankayala Satyanayana
 Anjali Devi as Janikamma
 Rama Prabha as Venkamma / Raja Hamsa
 Sri Lakshmi as Devakanya
 Mamatha as Devakanya
 Kalpana Rai as S. I. Sukumari

Soundtrack

Music composed by K. V. Mahadevan. Music released on Lahari Music Company. The song "Em Vaana" was inspired by the Tamil song "Naan Thedum Sevvanthi", composed by Ilaiyaraaja for Dharma Pathini (1986).

Others
 VCDs and DVDs on - VOLGA Videos, Hyderabad

External links 
 

1990 films
Films directed by A. Kodandarami Reddy
Films scored by K. V. Mahadevan
1990s Telugu-language films
Indian romantic comedy films
1990 romantic comedy films